Leosia is an album by Polish jazz trumpeter and composer Tomasz Stańko recorded in 1996 and released on the ECM label.

Reception
The Allmusic review by Michael G. Nastos awarded the album 3½ stars stating "As ECM recordings go, Leosia is one of the label's, and certainly trumpeter Tomasz Stanko's, definitive introspective and sedate musical statements. Not that in either instance these qualities have been in short supply, but here those themes of lush romanticism, thinly veiled mysticism, and pure ethereal thought could not be more concentrated or emphasized... Clearly a project moved by the death of a friend, it is a reminder of how life is fleeting, and words unspoken until it is too late can muster these feelings of abject regret".
The Penguin Guide to Jazz selected this album as part of its suggested Core Collection and awarded it a "Crown".

Track listing
All compositions by Tomasz Stańko except as indicated.

 "Morning Heavy Song" - 6:45
 "Die Weisheit Von le Comte Lautréamont" - 6:11
 "A Farewell to Maria" - 7:42
 "Brace" (Anders Jormin, Tony Oxley) - 4:10
 "Trinity" (Jormin, Oxley, Bobo Stenson) - 5:05
 "Forlorn Walk" (Jormin, Oxley, Stańko) - 2:12
 "Hungry Howl" - 9:53
 "No Bass Trio" (Oxley, Stańko, Stenson) - 6:02
 "Euforila" - 5:06
 "Leosia" - 9:22

Personnel
Tomasz Stańko - trumpet
Bobo Stenson - piano
Anders Jormin - bass
Tony Oxley - drums

References

ECM Records albums
Tomasz Stańko albums
1997 albums
Albums produced by Manfred Eicher